Wheels of Destiny is a 1934 American Western film directed by Alan James and written by Nate Gatzert. The film stars Ken Maynard, Dorothy Dix, Philo McCullough, Frank Rice, Jay Wilsey, Edward Coxen, Fred Sale Jr. and Fred MacKaye. The film was released on March 1, 1934, by Universal Pictures.

Plot

Cast          
Ken Maynard as Ken Manning
Dorothy Dix as Mary Collins
Philo McCullough as Rocky
Frank Rice as Pinwheel
Jay Wilsey as Bill Collins 
Edward Coxen as Dad Collins 
Fred Sale Jr. as Freddie Collins
Fred MacKaye as Red
Jack Rockwell as Ed
William Gould as Deacon
Nelson McDowell as Trapper
Chief John Big Tree as Chief War Eagle

References

External links
 

1934 films
American Western (genre) films
1934 Western (genre) films
Universal Pictures films
Films directed by Alan James
American black-and-white films
1930s English-language films
1930s American films